Peter J. Kim is an American food museum director and social entrepreneur. He served as the Founding Director of the Museum of Food and Drink, a nonprofit museum in Brooklyn, New York. Kim is the host and creator of Counterjam, a food and music podcast on the Food52 Podcast Network.

Early life and career 
The son of South Korean immigrants, Kim grew up in Danville, Illinois. After graduating from Brown University, he worked on Food Stamps outreach. Kim served as a Peace Corps volunteer in Cameroon, where he founded an arts nonprofit called L’Art de Vivre. Kim studied law at the University of Pennsylvania Law School and earned Master’s degrees from Sciences Po and the Sorbonne in Paris. Kim worked at Debevoise & Plimpton LLP, a major law firm with 650 lawyers in eight offices from Shanghai to Moscow. He worked in a group that specialized in international dispute resolution.

Museum of Food and Drink 
In 2012, Kim left his law firm position to work as the Museum of Food and Drink’s first director. Kim initially worked unpaid out of a 150-square-foot office in the East Village, where he headed a volunteer team. Kim and his team sought to create a major museum that combined multi-sensory experiences with food history, culture, commerce, and science.

In 2015, Kim opened MOFAD's first brick-and-mortar space in Williamsburg, Brooklyn, where it hosted exhibits on flavor science, Chinese American restaurants, Bangladeshi restaurateurs, chickens, and feasts and festivals. The museum featured an open kitchen that served dishes related to its exhibits. The museum's advisors include David Chang and Questlove.

In 2019, Kim announced MOFAD’s plans to open "African/American: Making the Nation’s Table" in partnership with The Africa Center. Curated by Jessica B. Harris, a food historian, it is the first exhibition in the United States to celebrate black chefs, farmers, and food producers. It aims to show how the African Diaspora has shaped American food culture. The exhibition will feature the Ebony Test Kitchen, which was saved from demolition and acquired by MOFAD. The exhibition's opening was postponed due to the COVID-19 pandemic.

Counterjam 
Kim is the host and creator of Counterjam, a show on the Food52 Podcast Network that celebrates culture through food and music. Notable guests include Roy Choi, Margaret Cho, Kelis, Jarobi White, Dan the Automator, Ego Nwodim, Femi Kuti, and Made Kuti.

References 

Social entrepreneurs
American lawyers
Year of birth missing (living people)
Living people